Scott Paul Green (born 15 January 1970) is an English football manager and former professional footballer who is the manager of Finnish club Pallo-Iirot.

As a player, he was a defender who notably played in the Premier League for Bolton Wanderers. He also played in the Football League with Wigan Athletic and Wrexham as well as non-league sides Telford United and Ashton United.

Following retirement, Green managed Ashton United before having spells as a youth coach at both Yeovil Town and Portsmouth.

Playing career
As a schoolboy, Green spent time at Walsall, West Brom and Wolverhampton Wanderers before Derby County took him on trial as a centre-forward where he would do two year apprenticeship and two-year professional. He ultimately failed to play a single game for Derby but would have a successful loan spell in 1989 with Finnish side Euran Pallo, scoring 23 goals in 17 matches. In 1990, Green signed for Bolton Wanderers for £50,000, making his début against Shrewsbury Town. scoring his first goal against Bristol City at Burnden Park. He would help Wanderers reach the play-offs that season, and made an appearance in the 1991 play-off final at Wembley against Tranmere. In 1993 Green would help Bolton Secure Promotion to the First Division by beating Preston North End on the final day of the season 1–0 at Burnden Park to secure automatic promotion. In 1994, Green switched to full-back helping Bolton achieve promotion to the Premier League and also played in the 1995 Football League Cup Final against Liverpool.

Green joined Wigan Athletic for £300,000 in June 1997, scoring on his début in a 5–2 win over Wycombe Wanderers on the opening day of the 1997/98 season. Now a regular fixture at right-back, he was part of the side that would win the Football League Trophy at Wembley in 1999 as an unused substitute. A virtual ever present in the first half of Wigan's First Division Championship winning season, he would be allowed to leave the club for Wrexham in 2003 where Green would also play a big part in gaining promotion with Wrexham to Division one. Green's second spell at Wrexham in 2005 would see him gain another medal in the Johnstone's Paint Trophy at the Millennium Stadium.

Coaching career
Green's first managerial job came in charge of Ashton United where he spent 18 months in charge from 2006 to 2007. On 15 October 2018, Green was appointed as manager of Finnish club Pallo-Iirot after spells at Preston North End Yeovil Town and Portsmouth.

Honours
Bolton Wanderers

1993 Promotion to Division 1

1995 Promotion to Premier League

1997 Promotion to Premier League

1995 League cup Runners up

Wigan Athletic

1999 Winner LDV Trophy

2003 Promotion to Championship

Wrexham

2003 Promotion to League 1

2005 Winners of Johnstone paint Trophy

References

External links 
 

1970 births
Living people
English footballers
English expatriate footballers
Expatriate footballers in Finland
Derby County F.C. players
Bolton Wanderers F.C. players
Wigan Athletic F.C. players
Wrexham A.F.C. players
Telford United F.C. players
Premier League players
Sportspeople from Walsall
Yeovil Town F.C. non-playing staff
Association football utility players
Ashton United F.C. players
Ashton United F.C. managers
English expatriate sportspeople in Finland
English football managers